Spirits of Fire is an American/Italian supergroup consisting of Savatage and Trans-Siberian Orchestra guitarist Chris Caffery, Testament bassist Steve Di Giorgio (ex-Death, ex-Iced Earth), and former Fates Warning drummer Mark Zonder. Tim "Ripper" Owens formerly of Judas Priest and Iced Earth was a founding member of the band before leaving in 2021. The identity of Owens' replacement was kept secret while the band was recording their second album. The new singer Fabio Lione (Angra, Turilli / Lione Rhapsody, ex-Rhapsody of Fire) was announced 8th december 2021 with their second album Embrace The Unknown that will released on 28th February 2022 via Frontiers Records.

The group was created in July 2017 by Los Angeles-based guitarist and producer Roy Z (Bruce Dickinson, Halford, Tribe of Gypsies).

Their first album, Spirits of Fire, was released on February 22, 2019 via Italian label Frontiers Records. It was produced by Roy Z; keyboards were played by Italian multi-instrumentalist Alessandro Del Vecchio (Hardline).

Their first single, "Light Speed Marching", was released on November 15, 2018.

Discography 
Spirits of Fire (2019)
Embrace the Unknown (2022)

Members 
 Fabio Lione - lead vocals (2021–present)
 Chris Caffery – guitars, backing vocals (2017–present)
 Steve Di Giorgio – bass (2017–present)
 Mark Zonder – drums (2017–present)

Past members 
 Tim "Ripper" Owens – lead vocals (2017–2021)

References 

American heavy metal musical groups
American hard rock musical groups
Musical groups established in 2017
Musical quartets
Rock music supergroups
2017 establishments in the United States